Picea breweriana, known as Brewer spruce, Brewer's weeping spruce, or weeping spruce, is a species of spruce native to western North America, where it is one of the rarest on the continent. The specific epithet breweriana is in honor of the American botanist William Henry Brewer.

Description 
The bark is thin and scaly, and purple-gray in color. The pendulous foliage only develops when the tree grows to about 1.5–2 m tall; young trees smaller than this (up to about 10–20 years old) are open-crowned with sparse, level branchlets. The shoots are orange-brown, with dense short pubescence about 0.2 millimetres long and very rough with pulvini 1–2 mm long.

The leaves are borne singly on the pulvini, and are needle-like (though not sharp), 15–35 mm long, flattened in cross-section, glossy dark green above, and with two bands of white stomata below.

They have smoothly rounded, thin, flexible scales 2 cm long. The immature cones are dark purple, maturing red-brown 5–7 months after pollination. The seeds are black, 3–4 mm long, with a slender, 12–18 mm long pale brown wing.

It occurs mainly on ridgetop sites with very heavy winter snow to provide a steady source of meltwater through the spring, but dry in the summer. The harsh ridgetop conditions minimize competition from other much faster-growing trees like Douglas-fir. It is very well adapted to cope with heavy snow and ice loads, with tough branches, and the drooping branchlets shedding snow readily.

Genome 
DNA analyses have shown that Picea breweriana has a basal position in the Picea clade, suggesting that Picea originated in North America.

Distribution 

Uses 
Outside its native range, P. breweriana is a highly valued ornamental tree in gardens, particularly in Great Britain and Scandinavia, where it is appreciated for its dramatically pendulous foliage. This plant has gained the Royal Horticultural Society's Award of Garden Merit.

References

External links

Catalogue of Life: Picea breweriana 
Picea breweriana on Conifer Country

breweriana
Flora of the Klamath Mountains
Endemic flora of the United States
Flora of California
Flora of Oregon
Trees of the Southwestern United States
Trees of the Northwestern United States